Air Commandant Dame Roberta Mary Whyte,  (6 June 1897 – 25 January 1979) 
was a British nurse and Royal Air force officer. From 1952 to 1956, she was Matron-in-Chief of Princess Mary's Royal Air Force Nursing Service.

She trained as a nurse at the King's College Hospital. After this she joined Princess Mary's Royal Air Force Nursing Service in 1929. She served until 1956, and, from 1952 to 1956, as Matron-in-Chief.

Whyte never married, and died in 1979, aged 81.

Honours
 Royal Red Cross (1949) 
 Queen's Honorary Nursing Sister (1952)
 Commander (Sister) of the Venerable Order of St John (1953) 
 Dame Commander of the Order of the British Empire (1955)

References

 

 
 
 

1897 births
1979 deaths
Place of birth missing
Place of death missing
British nurses
Princess Mary's Royal Air Force Nursing Service officers
Members of the Royal Red Cross
Dames Commander of the Order of the British Empire
Royal Air Force personnel of World War II